is a mystery manga by Matsuri Akino that was published by Akita Shoten and licensed by Tokyopop.

Reception
"This is fun, and it may be some of the best mystery comics geared at the teenage audience." — Leroy Douresseaux, Comic Book Bin.
"It seems to be written as a love letter to the classic mystery novel, but the execution is so over the map that it's hard to pin down exactly what Akino's trying to do here." — Greg Hackmann, Mania.
"Following the hallmarks of Japanese mystery, the story in Kamen Tantei features convoluted murder schemes and a puzzle-solving aspect that'd be considered old-fashoned in English-language novels." — Kevin Gifford, Newtype USA.
"I highly recommend this series as it has a lot of Akino-sensei’s trademark humor." — Lori Henderson, Manga Life.

References

External links
 
 

1999 manga
Mystery anime and manga
Tokyopop titles
Akita Shoten manga